Deh Soltan or Deh-e Soltan or Deh-i-Sultan may refer to:
 Deh Soltan, Semnan
 Deh-e Soltan, Sistan and Baluchestan